"Cash is king" is a colloquial phrase sometimes used in analyzing businesses or investment portfolios. It may refer to the importance of cash flow in the overall fiscal health of a business. In corporate finance, the expression refers to the fact that only future free cash flows or dividends are relevant for valuation (finance) and not, for example, accounting earnings.  For investors it may also describe times when it is advantageous to have a large percentage of cash or short-term debt instruments available either due to falling financial markets or due to the availability of investment opportunities.

The concept of "cash is king" describes the importance of sufficient cash as an asset in the business for short term operations, purchases and acquisitions. A company could have a large amount of accounts receivables on its balance sheet which would also increase equity, but the company could still be short on cash with which it can make purchases, including paying wages to workers for labor. Unless it was able to convert its accounts receivable and other current assets to cash quickly, it could fail and be technically bankrupt despite a positive net worth.

History
The origin of "cash is king" is unclear. The phrase became popularized following the global stock market crash of 1987 by Pehr G. Gyllenhammar, then CEO of Swedish car group Volvo.

Since 2000, the expression, "cash is king", has occasionally appeared in articles on the investing website Motley Fool, and is part of radio host Dave Ramsey's hourly show introduction

The phrase was frequently used by billionaire property developer Alex Spanos, whose 2002 book, Sharing the Wealth: My Story, includes the phrase, used as a chapter title, and later adopted by another NFL team owner of Greek heritage, Jack Welch.

Widely used during the global financial crisis of 2007–2008 and the Great Recession that followed, the phrase was also often used to describe companies which could avoid share issues or bankruptcy.

Commercial establishments that accept only cash payments have become suspect in the modern age. Gothamist co-founder and publisher Jake Dobkin wrote in 2014 about cash-only restaurants: "I figured that they must be running a tax scam, underreporting their sales to the state and pocketing the difference—maybe even laundering money".

The phrase is often used by convicted jewel thief Larry Lawton, although in a different context to mean it is best to rob cash as you don't have to sell it to a fence, potentially making the criminal process riskier. This phrase appears on his merchandise.

References

External links
 Cash is King Again – Motley Fool article describing the advantages of having cash available to invest.
 Cash is king in a recession!

Corporate finance
Working capital management
Cash